The following lists events that happened during 1842 in Australia.

Incumbents

Governors
Governors of the Australian colonies:
Governor of New South Wales - Sir George Gipps
Governor of South Australia - Sir George Grey
Governor of Tasmania - Captain Sir John Franklin
Governor of Western Australia as a Crown Colony - John Hutt.

Events
 20 July - an Act (6 Vic. No 3) passed "to declare the town of Sydney to be a city and to incorporate the inhabitants thereof".
 12 August - Melbourne incorporated as a "town".
 21 August - Hobart Town is proclaimed a city.

Births
 15 January – Mary MacKillop, religious sister (d. 1909)
 1 February – Robert Harper, Victorian politician (born in the United Kingdom) (d. 1919)
 26 April – Paddy Hannan, gold prospector (born in Ireland) (d. 1925)
 31 May – Sir John Cox Bray, 15th Premier of South Australia (d. 1894)
 22 June – Sir Richard Baker, South Australian politician (d. 1911)
 5 July – Andrew "Captain Moonlite" Scott, bushranger (born in Ireland) (d. 1880)
 17 July – Sir Alexander Onslow, 3rd Chief Justice of Western Australia (d. 1908)
 10 September – Charles French, horticulturist, naturalist, and entomologist (born in the United Kingdom) (d. 1933)
 23 September – John Brazier, malacologist (d. 1930)
 29 September – Sir Joseph Palmer Abbott, New South Wales politician (d. 1901)
 10 October – Emily Dobson, philanthropist (d. 1934)
 18 October – Robert Reid, Victorian politician (born in the United Kingdom) (d. 1904)
 18 November – Sir Frederick Broome, 11th Governor of Western Australia (born in Canada) (d. 1896)
 11 December – William Gosse, explorer (born in the United Kingdom) (d. 1881)
 14 December – Julia Matthews, actress and singer (born in the United Kingdom) (d. 1876)
 19 December – Emma Withnell, pastoralist and businesswoman (d. 1928)
 Unknown – Richard Edwards, Queensland politician (born in the United Kingdom) (d. 1915)
 Unknown – John Gilbert, bushranger (born in Canada) (d. 1865)

Deaths
 18 August – Louis de Freycinet, explorer (born and died in France) (b. 1779)

Notes

 
Australia
Years of the 19th century in Australia